Allan Beswick (born 8 October 1948 in Warrington, Lancashire) is a radio broadcaster who presents the late night phone-in on BBC Radio Manchester and BBC Radio Lancashire. Before starting his late-night phone show, Beswick presented the breakfast show on BBC Radio Manchester.

Career
Prior to becoming a radio presenter, Beswick worked as a soldier, a bus driver, a driving instructor and a mental health nurse and for the Citizen's Advice Bureau; during his time at the C.A.B. he began to appear as a guest on Dave Lincoln and Friends, a programme on Radio City 194m MW (1548 kHz) and 96.7 MHz VHF / FM, an independent commercial station in Liverpool. In the early to late eighties, he worked for Lancashire station Red Rose Radio [ 97.3 MHz later 97.4 MHz FM and 301m MW (999 kHz) ] where he initially presented an afternoon show which won him a Sony national radio award. He then presented a late-night phone-in The Allan Beswick Late Night Show. which drew listeners and controversy in nearly equal measure. His listening figures for this late night slot often drew audiences equal to those of many radio stations breakfast shows. The overall 'audience reach' of the programme drew in the region of 100,000 listeners per night, but a total listenership across the North West, West Yorkshire and North Wales often approached 500,000 listeners.

He was well known for his straight-talking, uncompromising style, ability to argue his case stubbornly, often playing devil's advocate and he had a penchant for insulting callers with whom he disagreed or did not like. He was also known for his on-air professed dislike of Liverpudlians ("scousers"), which perversely made him popular with Liverpool listeners, as they felt he typified woollybacks – people from outside the city –  and all that was wrong with them.  He has since said it was an act and he has no problem with Merseysiders. Other groups to incur his ire were train spotters and freemasons. Callers were met usually with the introduction of 'How do'.  The show ran from 10pm to 1am Monday to Thursday with the first hour usually having music content, which turned virtually exclusively to talk after the 11 pm news.

The show 'or programme' as he referred to it, drew comparisons with similar northern based late night phone in shows with James Whale at Red Rose Radio's sister station Radio Aire in Leeds, James H Reeve and James Stannage at Piccadilly Radio in Manchester on 261m MW (1152 kHz) and 97.0 MHz FM later Key 103 on 103.0 MHz FM.

During the Red Rose era Allan released, in limited quantities, 2 'Best of' cassettes and one 7" single record. 'Beswick's Big Blue Cassette', which featured some of the funniest callers to the programme on Telephone number on Preston (STD Code : 0772) 561000 - which later changed to (01772) 561000.

During his time at Red Rose Radio, Beswick also hosted a Sunday morning call in game show called 'It's Your Turn.'  His assistant was credited as Wobbly Warren. Allan occasionally took his show to live venues throughout the Red Rose area, mainly in Lancashire and on Merseyside.

He recorded Jehovah's Witness at the Door for the double CD 'Guide Cats for the Blind' (songs and poems of Les Barker) in 2008.

An on-air incident led to his being banned for a period by the Independent Broadcasting Authority for being abusive to a caller. Red Rose held a ballot to see if he should be re-instated, which he subsequently was. This second coming lasted about a year. He soon moved to BBC Radio Manchester where he presented a lunchtime show, the morning show and later the breakfast show, moving back to his familiar late night spot in early 2015. In April 2007 a humorous comment Beswick made about the death of Alan Ball on a lunchtime broadcast drew complaints, resulting in an apology both from the BBC and Beswick himself.

Beswick has also worked on BBC Radio 5 live, presenting late night sporadically in the early part of the last decade, and on television, including a slot as presenter of "Beswick's Beat", a local current affairs segment on North West Tonight.

On 2 February 2015, Allan took over the networked late show on both BBC Radio Manchester and BBC Radio Lancashire. The show, which is produced from Media City and broadcasts from Allan's home in North Wales, is mainly a phone-in with one or two music tracks at the beginning of the first hour.

In May 2021, it was announced that Beswick's late show would be moving to weekends only. In addition to BBC stations Radio Lancashire and Manchester, the new show also airs on Radio Merseyside.

References 

British radio personalities
English socialists
English agnostics
Living people
1948 births